The Solo Guitar of Bola Sete is an album by Brazilian guitarist Bola Sete, released in 1965 through Fantasy Records.

Release and reception 

Ron Wynn of allmusic called Solo Guitar an excellent showcase for Sete's skill, marked by "fluid passages, evocative quality, and a good blend of romantic, aggressive material."

Track listing

Release history

Personnel 
Bola Sete – guitar

References 

1965 albums
Bola Sete albums
Fantasy Records albums